is a Japanese film, television and music video director.

Works

Films

TV series
Dragon Seinendan (2012)
Irodorihimura (2012, episode 4)

Music videos

"Tomorrow's Way"
"Life"
"Tokyo"
"Rolling Star"
"Cherry"
"LOVE & TRUTH (Movie Ver.)"
"Namidairo"
"Hana no Uta"

Other
Happy! School Days! (web, 2010, episode 2 Hello Goodbye)

References

External links
 

Japanese film directors
Japanese television directors
Living people
Japanese music video directors
Waseda University alumni
1974 births
People from Tokushima Prefecture